State Route 233 (SR 233) is a state highway located on Mount Desert Island on the southern central coast of Maine. Its western terminus is at SR 3 and SR 198 in the town of Mount Desert. SR 233 services Acadia National Park and provides a direct connection between Mount Desert and Bar Harbor, bypassing a  section of SR 3 which loops the perimeter of the eastern lobe of the island. It is locally named Eagle Lake Road.

Route description
The winding highway cuts directly across the center of the island to Bar Harbor, where it terminates at SR 3 in the town center. The headquarters of Acadia National Park and an access point to its carriage road network are located on SR 233.

History
SR 233 was designated in 1956 over entirely new routing. Its alignment has not changed since.

Major intersections

See also

References

External links

Floodgap Roadgap's RoadsAroundME: Maine State Route 233

233
Transportation in Hancock County, Maine